Lewis Morgan Rees (7 January 1910 – 21 December 1976) was a Welsh dual-code international rugby union, and professional rugby league footballer who played in the 1930s and 1940s.

Background
Rees was born in Treherbert, Wales, and he died aged 66 in Manchester.

International honours
Lou Rees won a cap for Wales (RU) while at Cardiff on Saturday 11 March 1933 against Ireland, and won 5 caps for Wales (RL) in 1935–1938 while at Oldham.

References

External links
Statistics at orl-heritagetrust.org.uk

1910 births
1976 deaths
Cardiff RFC players
Dual-code rugby internationals
Oldham R.L.F.C. players
Rugby league players from Treherbert
Rugby league props
Rugby union flankers
Rugby union players from Treherbert
Treorchy RFC players
Wales international rugby union players
Wales national rugby league team players
Welsh rugby league players
Welsh rugby union players